Shreya Gupto is an Indian actress who mainly works in Tamil, Hindi films and web shows. She is known for her roles in Vaaranam Aayiram (2008), Mathiyaal Vell and Darbar (2020).

Early life
Shreya Gupta was born in Kolkata, West Bengal and brought up in Chennai, Tamil Nadu. She did her graduation in B.Com at M.O.P. Vaishnav College for Women, Chennai. She completed her post graduation in Media communications at Christ University, Bangalore. Shreya have Palmar hyperhidrosis.

Career 
Shreya Gupto  joined Anupam Kher’s acting school ‘Actor Prepares’, after which she started getting advertisement opportunities. She went on to work in about 25 advertisements till 2022. Shreya started her career as child artist in Tamil films like Vaaranam Aayiram, Pallikoodam, Thiruvilaiyaadal Aarambam. Later she acted in Tamil films Arrambam,  Romeo Juliet. Shreya was one of the protagonists in the web series Ragini MMS: Returns. She was praised for her role of Shreya Mukherjee in the Zoom Studios original web series Mom and Co, released in 2019. She played the role of Ritu in web series Firsts, which released in 2020. She also acted in web series Going Viral Pvt. Ltd. which released on Amazon Prime. Shreya Gupto appeared in other web shows like When You Meet Your Ex portraying Tanya opposite Ayush Mehra, 'Love Ki Expiry Date' with Archak Chhabra and Filter Copy’s Why to date Bengali guy with Vishal Vashishtha. She also acted in short films like Julie and After Life.

Filmography

Films 
 Thiruvilaiyaadal Aarambam (2006)
 Pallikoodam (2007) as child Kokila
 Vaaranam Aayiram (2008) 
 Mathiyaal Vell 
 Arrambam (2013)
 Romeo Juliet (2015) as Tina
 Darbar (2020) as Minister's daughter

Television
 Pyaar Tune Kya Kiya (TV series) 
 India's Best Dramebaaz

Web series 
 Ragini MMS: Returns (2017) as Zoya
 Mom and Co (2019)
 Firsts (2020)
 Bang Baang (2021) as Ramona
 Couple Goals (Season 2) (2021)

References

External links 

Living people
Indian television actresses
1995 births
Actresses in Hindi television
21st-century Indian actresses
Indian child actresses
Fashion YouTubers